Joseph Daniel Lasica is an American entrepreneur, public speaker and journalist. He is the author of Darknet: Hollywood's War Against the Digital Generation (2005), a book about the copyright wars and the future of media.

Early years

Lasica was born in Passaic, New Jersey and graduated from Rutgers University, where he holds a BA in communication.

He began working in journalism as a reporter for the Passaic Herald News, then held several editing positions at the Sacramento Union and Sacramento Bee in California.  He left newspapers in 1997 when he joined Microsoft's Sidewalk.com city guide as copy chief and managing editor.

Media career

From 1997 to 2005, Lasica wrote dozens of freelance articles for publications such as the American Journalism Review, where he was its first new media columnist; the Online Journalism Review, where he was its chief columnist; and the now-defunct Industry Standard magazine. In 2003 Lasica was editor of the white paper We Media: How Audiences Are Shaping the Future of News and Information, published by the Media Center at the American Press Institute. From 2004 to 2005 he was a columnist for Engadget, a technology blog. His book "Darknet" came out in May 2005.

In March 2005 he co-founded Ourmedia, a grassroots media community and one of the first video hosting and sharing sites on the Internet, with co-founder Marc Canter. He served as its chief executive until his departure in December 2008.

Lasica was also founder and president of Socialmedia.biz, a consulting firm and collaborative blog that provides social media services to companies. In May 2009 he launched Socialbrite.org, a learning center and collaborative blog for nonprofits and social change organizations.

Selected works

Darknet: Hollywood's War Against the Digital Generation 

He has written three reports for the Aspen Institute:

(1) The Mobile Generation: Global Transformations at the Cellular Level.

(2) Civic Engagement on the Move: How mobile media can serve the public good.

(3) Identity in the Age of Cloud Computing: The next-generation Internet's impact on business, governance and social interaction.

References

External links

American male journalists
Living people
American bloggers
Year of birth missing (living people)
Rutgers University alumni
21st-century American non-fiction writers
American male bloggers